Nancy Roberts is the name of:
Nancy Roberts (producer), motion picture and television producer and writer
Nancy Roberts (author) (1924–2008), often described as the "First Lady of American Folklore"
Nancy N. Roberts, translator